Jeffrey Kermit Walls (August 29, 1956 - May 29, 2019) was an American musician, songwriter and producer best known for his dynamic guitar style. He was a founding member and guitarist of the Marietta, Georgia, 1980s alternative rock band Guadalcanal Diary.

Guadalcanal Diary
Guadalcanal Diary was from Marietta, Georgia, a northern Atlanta suburb. Following their initial collaboration in Strictly American, a high school punk band, Walls and Murray Attaway (vocals and guitar) formed Guadalcanal Diary in 1981. Guadalcanal Diary released Watusi Rodeo, an early EP, and the full-length LP Walking in The Shadow of The Big Man on DB Records, before signing with major label Elektra Records in 1985. Elektra subsequently re-released the LP, followed by three others: Jamboree (1986), 2X4 (1987), and Flip-Flop (1989).

Guadalcanal Diary had several reunions in the late 1990s, one of which produced the 1999 self-released live album, At Your Birthday Party. The album was re-released in 2018 on the Omnivore Recordings label. The band reunited briefly in 2011 to celebrate their 30th anniversary.

Several Guadalcanal Diary songs were featured on the television show Billions.

Hillbilly Frankenstein 
Following Guadalcanal Diary’s breakup in 1989, Walls formed rockabilly/lounge band Hillbilly Frankenstein. Hillbilly Frankenstein was featured in the documentary Sleazefest: The Movie from No Place Like Home Productions. The documentary chronicled the 1994 two-day music festival in Chapel Hill, North Carolina that celebrated rockabilly and garage rock music. Hillbilly Frankenstein released one LP on Zontar Records, ‘Hypnotica,’ and had begun recording new material before disbanding in 1995.

Family 
In 1988, Jeff Walls and Rhett Crowe, bassist for Guadalcanal Diary, married. Their daughter, Lillian, was born the following year.  Their son, Carson, was born in 1990. Walls and Crowe later divorced. In 1997, Jeff married Hillbilly Frankenstein bassist, Phyllis (Bridges) Walls and welcomed stepdaughter, Maggie.  Grandchildren include Kaitlyn (2003), Eva (2015) and Ezra (2020).

The Woggles 
In 1990, Walls began a close association with 60’s influenced garage band, The Woggles, producing and playing on a number of their recordings.  The group maintained a heavy U.S and international touring schedule, and when guitarist George Holton died in 2003, Walls stepped in, once again assuming the tongue-in-cheek moniker, ‘The Flesh Hammer,’ from his theme song in Hillbilly Frankenstein.  He soon became a full-time member of The Woggles, and continued to produce and play guitar with the group until his death.

Bomber City 
In addition to his ongoing work as guitarist for The Woggles, Walls formed the group Bomber City with his wife, bassist Phyllis Walls, and former Guadalcanal Diary bandmate, Murray Attaway.

Bomber City's music included many collaborative songs written by Attaway and Walls, music from Attaway's solo album In Thrall, as well as some fan-favorite Guadalcanal Diary songs. Joining Attaway, Jeff, and Phyllis in Bomber City was Pat Patterson (Hillbilly Frankenstein, Black Label Orchestra) on drums, vocalist/percussionist Diana Crowe (Hillbilly Frankenstein) and Doug Stanley on keyboards & guitar (Love Tractor, Black Label Orchestra, the Helium Kids, the Glands, the Nairobi Trio).

Other Musical Endeavors
Walls’ other musical endeavors included the bands Blasting Cap (with Robert Schmid of The Swimming Pool Q's on drums) and the Nairobi Trio, an R&B and soul project.

Jeff collaborated with several other notable performers, including English singer-songwriter  Holly Golightly, Rock and Roll Hall of Fame inductee, Hilton Valentine (original guitarist, The Animals), and a re-formed version of the Plimsouls (as a bassist).

Death 
Walls died May 29, 2019 of pancreatic cancer while being evaluated for treatment for a much rarer condition.  Fund-raisers and tribute concerts honoring the charismatic performer were held all over the country during the months that followed. Following Walls’ death, numerous fund-raising concerts have been announced in Athens and Atlanta, Georgia to help raise money for Walls’ widow and surviving family.

Legacy 
Upon Walls' death, Steven Van Zandt stated: “What a shocking great loss. One of the most talented Guitarist/Producers I’ve ever known. Our deepest love and sympathy to his family and friends from his other family here at Wicked Cool and the Underground Garage."

Discography

Guadalcanal Diary albums

Woggles albums

References 

1956 births
2019 deaths
American rock guitarists
Guitarists from Georgia (U.S. state)
Musicians from Marietta, Georgia
Deaths from pancreatic cancer